Dunphy's sign is a medical sign characterized by increased abdominal pain with coughing.  It may be an indicator of appendicitis. Named after Osborne Joby Dunphy (1898–1989), a British-American physician.

References

Medical signs